Kurnool state was a small princely state during the Company rule in India. It had its capital at the town of Kurnool in the present-day state of Andhra Pradesh and was eventually annexed by the East India Company.

History
Kurnool State was established by a Pathan general. It was ruled by Nawabs until the British Government took over in 1839. Kurnool was initially under the suzerainty of the Nizam of Hyderabad. After the Nizam ceded the region to the East India Company, the nawab, Aluf Khan, agreed to pay a voluntary peishcush of rupees one lakh to the Company government.

Uprising against the company
Ghulam Rasul Khan Bahadur (died on 12 July 1840) was the last Nawab of Kurnool. He ruled from 1823 to 1839 until the kingdom was defeated by the East India Company.

The Wahhabi movement was popularised in India by Shah Ismail Dehlvi in the 18th century. Mubarez-ud-Daulah, younger brother of the Nizam of Hyderabad, Nasir-ud-Daulah, was inspired by the Wahhabi movement. According to Thomas Herbert Maddock, Mubarez-ud-Daulah was instrumental in spreading the Wahhabi movement in the Deccan region.

Nawab Rasool Khan of Kurnool was also influenced by the movement. When Mubarez-ud-Daulah learned of it, he struck a secret deal with him. According to the deal, Rasool Khan would set up a secret arsenal to manufacture arms. In return, Mubarez-ud-Daulah would provide monetary help.

In , a rumour spread that a Russian army was advancing towards India from Central Asia. It was also believed that the combined armies of Mubarez-ud-Daulah and Rasool Khan would overthrown the East India Company and defeat Nizam Nasir-ud-Daulah. Subsequently, the Maratha Empire would be restored and Mubarez-ud-Daulah would be appointed subahdar of Deccan by Mohammad Shah Qajar, the Shah of Persia.

 On 12 October 1839, a war broke out between British Indian Army and the kingdom and continued for six days until the king was detained on 18 October. He was subsequently sent to Tiruchirappalli Central Prison where he died on 12 July 1840.

Rulers
List of the Pathan nawabs of Kurnool-
? - 1674 - Khizr Khan
1690 - ? - Daud Khan
? - 1724 - Ibrahim Khan
1724 - 1733 - Alif Khan
1733 - 1751 - Himayat Bahadur Khan
1751 - 1792 - Munawwar Khan
1792 - 1815 - Aluf Khan/Alif Khan II
1815 - Muzaffar Khan
1815 - 1823 - Munawwar Khan
1823 - 1839 - Ghulam Rasul Khan

See also
Kurnool
Company rule in India
Andhra Pradesh
List of princely states

References

Princely states of Andhra Pradesh